Water Forest Press is an independent book publisher located in rural Pennsylvania. It was created as an imprint of magazine publisher Skyline Publications but moved to book publishing when Skyline shut down.

History 

Water Forest Press was created by Victoria Valentine, as an imprint of Skyline Publications. Skyline Publications produced print magazines that were retired in 2004. Water Forest Press replaced Skyline Magazines with Skyline Review, Literary House Review & Hudson View Poetry Digest books. Skyline Publications published monthly literary magazines that were distributed nationwide in stores, libraries, universities and homes, with a readership of approximately 10,000 per issue. "A Tribute To America" issue (dedicated to 9/11) was reprinted three times. All proceeds from the Tribute Issue were donated to local fire houses to purchase needed equipment.

Water Forest Press is now a small, specialty publisher, designing and producing poetry collections, short-story collections and multi-genre fiction and non-fiction trade paperback books.  The press annually nominates writers & poets from each publication for Pushcart Prize Best of the Small Presses. Water Forest Press volumes are archived in the New York Public Library, John D. Rockefeller, Jr. Library, University of Wisconsin–Madison Library, Brown University Rockefeller Library and UC Berkeley Library. Water Forest Press Books at Oslo Norway Writer's Conference 2008.

Water Forest Press, under Skyline Online imprint, encourages and promotes young poets on "Street Speakers" Teen Ink.

Publications and authors 
Quarterly Hudson View Poetry Digest
Annual Skyline Review
Annual Literary House Review

Authors & poets published

Featured artists

References 

 Public Relations 
 Writers and Small Press Publishers: A View From Both Sides 
 Skyline Magazine Archives 
 Water Forest Press books at Oslo Norway Writer's Conference 2008

External links 
Water Forest Press
Skyline Magazine Online
Skyline Review

Literature lists
Poetry publishers
Book publishing companies based in Pennsylvania